The 1981 Estonian SSR Football Championship was won by Tallinna Dünamo.

League table

References

 

Estonian Football Championship
Est
Football